The following are lists of the highest and lowest temperatures recorded in Spain.

Highest Temperatures Ever Recorded in Spain

Top 10 warmest days in Madrid
This list consists of the 10 warmest days ever recorded in Madrid, the capital city of Spain. 

1. 40.7°C, 14 July 2022

2. 40.7°C, 14 August 2021

3. 40.7°C, 28 June 2019

4. 40.6°C, 10 August 2012

5. 40.3°C, 13 August 2021

6. 40.0°C, 29 June 2019

7. 40.0°C, 17 June 2017

8. 40.0°C, 20 August 1993

9. 39.9°C, 3 August 2018

10. 39.8°C, 15 August 2021

Lowest Temperatures Ever Recorded in Spain

Notes

External links
Temperaturas históricas en España
Consejería de Agricultura y Pesca de la Junta de Andalucía - Estaciones Agroclimáticas

Climate of Spain
Spain-related lists
Spain